Calabasas is a city in the southwestern region of the San Fernando Valley in Los Angeles County, California, United States.

Name and logo
The name Calabasas is a variant spelling of the Spanish word calabazas, meaning "winter squashes". Some historians hold the theory that Calabasas is derived from the Chumash word calahoosa, which is said to mean "where the wild geese fly". Owing to vast presence of wild squash plants in the area, the squash theory is more prevalent among residents. At the top of the Calabasas grade, which is east of Las Virgenes Road, legend has it that in 1824 a Basque rancher from Oxnard spilled a wagonload of pumpkins on the road en route to Los Angeles. The following spring hundreds of pumpkins sprouted alongside the road. The area was named Las Calabasas—the place where the pumpkins fell. Spanish botanist, Jose Longinos Martinez, recorded "Las Calabazas" as a place name in 1792 which predates the legend.

The city's official logo depicts a red-tailed hawk soaring over mountains.

History
Centuries ago, Chumash Native Americans lived in the area that is now Calabasas. Spanish explorers were the first Europeans to arrive in the area. In 1770, an expedition headed by Gaspar de Portolá crossed through the area on their return southward to Mexico after venturing into Northern California. In 1776, another party of explorers led by Juan Bautista de Anza camped there on their way northward from Mexico.

Calabasas was the name given to a ranchería in the Los Angeles area in 1795. The Leonis Adobe, an adobe structure in Old Town Calabasas, dates from 1844 and is one of the oldest surviving buildings in greater Los Angeles. The city was incorporated on April 5, 1991, making it the newest city in Los Angeles County.

On January 26, 2020, a Sikorsky S-76 crashed in Calabasas after an earlier takeoff from John Wayne Airport. All nine people on board, including Hall of Fame basketball player Kobe Bryant and his 13-year-old daughter Gianna, were killed.

Geography
Calabasas is situated in the southwestern region of the San Fernando Valley, between the foothills of the Santa Monica and Santa Susana mountains. The city is bordered by the Woodland Hills neighborhood of Los Angeles to the northeast, Topanga to the east, Malibu to the south, Agoura Hills to the west, and Hidden Hills to the north. The commemorative El Camino Real runs east–west through Calabasas as the Ventura Freeway (US 101).

One of the oldest neighborhoods in Calabasas is Park Moderne, or the "Bird Streets". A former artists' colony, remnants remain of the club house, pool, and cabins scattered across streets with bird names, such as Meadow Lark, Blackbird, Bluebird, and Hummingbird located right behind Calabasas High School.

Climate
Calabasas has a hot-summer Mediterranean climate with mild, relatively wet winters and hot, dry summers.

Communities 
Below is a list of residential communities within Calabasas. They are organized by the street they are connected to. 
From Parkway Calabasas: 
 Hidden Hills West, Calabasas Hills, Calabasas Park Estates, and Park Granada or Mulholland Drive.
 From Valley Circle/Mulholland: 
 Mulholland Heights, Mulwood, Las Villas, Bellagio, The Ridge, Creekside, Clairidge, Calabasas Country Estates, Calabasas Highlands, Mountain Park, Abercrombie Ranch Estates, Cold Creek, and Park Moderne.
 From Las Virgenes: 
 Mountain View Estates, Monte Nido, Deer Springs, Stone Creek, El Encanto, Mont Calabasas, Malibu Canyon Park, The Colony at Calabasas, and Avalon Calabasas (formerly Archstone Calabasas). 
 From Lost Hills Road
 Calabasas View, Saratoga Hills, Saratoga Ranch, Deer Springs, and Steeplechase.

Mont Calabasas, a community on Las Virgenes Road, was annexed into the city of Calabasas in 2011. Prior to annexation, the neighborhood was located in an unincorporated area of Los Angeles County.

Demographics

2010
The 2010 United States Census reported Calabasas to have a population of 23,058.

The Census reported that 23,049 people lived in households, 9 lived in non-institutionalized group quarters, and none were institutionalized. Of 8,543 households, 3,320 (38.9%) had children under the age of 18 living at home, 5,124 (60.0%) were opposite-sex married couples living together, 942 (11.0%) had a female householder with no husband present, 315 (3.7%) had a male householder with no wife present, 310 (3.6%) were unmarried opposite-sex partnerships, and 31 (0.4%) were same-sex married couples or partnerships. About 1,624 households (19.0%) were made up of individuals, and 525 (6.1%) consisted of someone living alone who was age 65 or older. The average household size was 2.70. There were 6,381 families (74.7% of all households); the average family size was 3.11.

The population consisted of 5,841 people (25.3%) under age 18, 1,875 people (8.1%) age 18 to 24, 5,025 people (21.8%) age 25 to 44, 7,414 people (32.2%) age 45 to 64, and 2,903 people (12.6%) age 65 or older. The median age was 41.6 years. For every 100 females, there were 93.6 males. For every 100 females age 18 and over, there were 89.8 males age 18 and over.

The 8,878 housing units averaged 685.5 per square mile (264.7/km), of which 6,287 (73.6%) were owner-occupied, and 2,256 (26.4%) were occupied by renters. The homeowner vacancy rate was 1.2%; the rental vacancy rate was 5.2%. Around 17,769 people (77.1% of the population) lived in owner-occupied housing units and 5,280 people (22.9%) lived in rental housing units.

According to the 2010 United States Census, Calabasas had a median household income of $124,583, with 6.6% of the population living below the federal poverty line.

2005
As of 2005, 23,123 people, 8,350 households, and 5,544 families resided in the city. The population density was 1,528.8 inhabitants per square mile (590.4/km). The 8,350 housing units averaged 566.7 per square mile (218.9/km). The racial makeup of the city was 85.92% White (including a large Iranian community and people of Jewish faith and ancestry), 2.18% Black or African American, 0.13% Native American, 7.71% Asian, 0.04% Pacific Islander, 1.31% from other races, and 2.71% from two or more races. About 4.74% of the population were Hispanics or Latinos of any race.

Of 8,350 households, 44.4% had children under the age of 18 living at home, 64.3% were married couples living together, 9.0% had a female householder with no husband present, and 23.3% were not families. About 17.0% of all households were made up of individuals, and 4.1% had someone living alone who was age 65 or older. The average household size was 2.76 and the average family size was 3.14.

The population consisted of 28.6% under age 18, 5.8% from 18 to 24, 29.1% from 25 to 44, 27.9% from 45 to 64, and 8.6% age 65 or older. The median age was 38 years. For every 100 females, there were 94.6 males. For every 100 females age 18 and over, there were 90.2 males.

According to a 2007 estimate, the median income for a household in the city was $104,935, and for a family was $122,482. Males had a median income of $87,049 versus $46,403 for females. The per capita income for the city was $48,189. About 2.1% of families and 3.3% of the population were below the poverty line, including 3.4% of those under age 18 and 1.7% of those age 65 or over.

Economy

The corporate headquarters of Harbor Freight Tools, The Cheesecake Factory and DTS Inc. are located in Calabasas. Calabasas is also known as one of the wealthiest cities in the United States.

Top employers
According to the city's 2020 Comprehensive Annual Financial Report, the top employers in the city are:

Technology center
During the dot-com bubble, a number of technology companies were located on a stretch of Agoura Rd. parallel to the US 101 Freeway, leading that area of Calabasas to develop a reputation as the "101 Technology Corridor". These businesses included several computer-networking companies Xylan (later Alcatel-Lucent), Netcom Systems (later Spirent Communications), Ixia Communications, j2 Global Communications, Tekelec, and software company Digital Insight. Although some of these companies have since relocated, been acquired, or ceased operations, the area continues to be home to a significant technology presence.

Arts and culture

Annual events
The city sponsors many annual events including:
 The Pumpkin Festival
 Eggstravaganza
 The Fine Arts Festival
 The Fourth of July Spectacular
 The Calabasas Film Festival

Weekly events
The Calabasas Farmers Market is held every Saturday from 8:00am to 1:00pm at 23504 Calabasas Road.

Tourism

Claretville of Calabasas / King Gillette Ranch

The Claretians (The Missionary Sons of the Immaculate Heart of Mary in Rome, or The Claretian Order) of the Roman Catholic Church had come to Southern California by way of Mexico in the early 1900s, working in Los Angeles inner-city missions. From 1952 to 1977, they operated the Theological Seminary of Claretville and the Immaculate Heart Claretian Novitiate on the former Gillette Estate, which they renamed Claretville. Thomas Aquinas College rented the Claretville campus from the Claretians from 1971 to 1978. When the Claretians sold their Claretville property in 1978 to Clare Prophet and her Church Universal and Triumphant, Thomas Aquinas College began construction on a permanent campus in Santa Paula, California. The Gillette Estate/Claretville property is known as the King Gillette Ranch and is part of Malibu Creek State Park. The land and historic structures by architect Wallace Neff are at the intersection of Mulholland Highway and Las Virgenes Road in unincorporated Calabasas.

Hindu temple
The Malibu Hindu Temple, located on Las Virgenes Road in unincorporated Calabasas, is visited by many Hindus and others from both in and outside California. The Hindu Temple Society of Southern California was incorporated in the State of California as a nonprofit religious organization on August 18, 1977.

Parks and recreation
The City of Calabasas Community Services Department operates a number of facilities.

These include:
 Calabasas Senior Center: 300 Civic Center Way
 Calabasas Tennis and Swim Center: 23400 Park Sorrento
 Calabasas Klubhouse and Creekside Park: 3655 Old Topanga Canyon Road
 Juan Bautista de Anza Park: 3701 Lost Hills Road
 Grape Arbor Park: 5100 Parkville Road
 Gates Canyon Park and Brandon's Village
 Wild Walnut Park: 23050 Mulholland Highway
 Highlands Park: 23581 Summit Drive

Brandon's Village is a public playground located at Gates Canyon Park in Calabasas. It serves over 5,000 special needs children from Calabasas and surrounding communities. Its playground equipment is over 70% independently playable by children with disabilities, and also provides meaningful and stimulating play opportunities for children without disabilities.

Grape Arbor Park is a small park and green space situated on Lost Road Hills off Ventura Freeway in Calabasas, and serves the surrounding residential area. The park includes a baseball diamond, tennis court, sand volleyball court, playground, and picnic tables. In 2018, the park was damaged during the Woolsey Fire, with playground equipment, landscaping, and irrigation needing repair. The park was renovated by the city, with reconstruction being completed in 2020.

Calabasas Bark Park is a small dog park with a grass space and separated gated children's area with water fountains. The park is also connected to a small maintained hiking trail.

Wild Walnut Park is an outdoor preserve located along Mulholland Highway in Calabasas. The park features walking paths and picnic benches. In 2020, a portion of the park was approved to be used as a dog park.

Government
City policies are enacted by a five-member city council. Council members serve overlapping four-year terms and are elected at-large, on a non-partisan basis. Each year, the council selects one of its members to act as mayor and preside over city council meetings; A mayor pro tempore is also selected at this time, to serve for one year, concurrent to the mayoral term. While the mayor has additional responsibilities/duties, the mayor is not vested with any additional administrative authority.

The City of Calabasas uses a council-manager model of local government. The city council is primarily responsible for legislative, financial, and political matters, while an appointed city manager serves as the city's chief executive. The city manager is primarily responsible for managing day-to-day operations and providing general oversight. The city manager is appointed by and serves at the pleasure of the city council.

National and State Representation 

Environmental stewardship
In 2005, Calabasas voters overwhelmingly passed Measure D. The ordinance protects and preserves existing areas of open space in Calabasas by requiring two-thirds voter approval before any land in the city designated as open space may be redesignated for another use.

In 2007, the Calabasas City Council adopted Ordinance 2007-233, banning retail food establishments, nonprofit food providers, and city facilities from using food-packaging materials made of expanded polystyrene (Styrofoam). The ordinance requires food-service establishments in Calabasas to use environmentally acceptable packaging starting March 31, 2008, and to report ongoing compliance with this ordinance on the first business day of each calendar year.

In 2011, the City Council passed Ordinance 2011-282 which banned grocery stores, convenience stores (minimarts), liquor stores, drug stores, and pharmacies from furnishing single-use plastic carryout bags. The ordinance also requires that if those businesses furnish paper carryout bags, they must charge customers 10 cents per bag.

Second-hand smoke ordinance
In February 2006, Calabasas enacted the Comprehensive Second-Hand Smoke Control Ordinance that prohibits smoking in all public places in the City of Calabasas where other persons may be exposed to second-hand smoke. These places include indoor and outdoor businesses, hotels, parks, apartment common areas, restaurants, and bars where people can be reasonably expected to congregate or meet. Under the law, smoking outdoors in public areas within the city is restricted to select "designated smoking areas". The law went into effect on March 16, 2006, garnering much local and national media attention. The full text of the ordinance may be found at Calabasas' official website. The ordinance was expanded in early 2008, requiring 80% of rental apartment buildings to be permanently designated as non-smoking units by January 1, 2012.

Education
Calabasas residents are zoned to schools in the Las Virgenes Unified School District. The district also serves the nearby communities of Agoura Hills, Bell Canyon, and Hidden Hills, and certain smaller areas. Calabasas High School is a part of the district.

In January 2004, Alice C. Stelle Middle School, located at the corner of Mulholland Highway and Paul Revere Road, was opened to serve the eastern half of the city. The western half is served by Arthur E. Wright Middle School, located on Las Virgenes Road, which prior to 2004, was the city's only middle school.

Calabasas is also home to Chaparral, Round Meadow, Lupin Hill, and Bay Laurel public elementary schools, which are part of the Las Virgenes Unified School District, as well as the private Viewpoint School.

Infrastructure

Public services
Calabasas funds its own public transportation in the form of a shuttle and trolley service. It augments the service provided by the Los Angeles County Metropolitan Transportation Authority and funds its own municipal library (as opposed to participating in the Los Angeles County library system), runs the Calabasas Tennis and Swim Center, Creekside Klubhouse, public parks, and has a protected and maintained historical district called "Old Town Calabasas".

Calabasas has two branches of the United States Postal Service located in Suite 10 at 4774 Park Granada, and at the Malibu Shell Post Office at 4807 Las Virgenes Road.

The City of Calabasas contracts with the County of Los Angeles to provide emergency services.:

The Los Angeles County Sheriff's Department  operates the Malibu/Lost Hills Station at 27050 Agoura Road in Calabasas.

The Los Angeles County Fire Department provides medical and fire suppression services to Calabasas. LACFD operates two stations in the City of Calabasas located at 5215 Las Virgines Road, and 24130 Calabasas Road.

In popular culture
Calabasas Park Golf Club sits where Warner Bros. Ranch was located. Films shot there include Showboat (1951), High Noon (1952), Calamity Jane (1953), Stalag 17 (1953), and Carousel (1956).

Author Lee Goldberg's novel Lost Hills, the first in a series of books about Detective Eve Ronin, the youngest homicide detective in the history of the Los Angeles County Sheriff's Department, is set in Calabasas. The novel debuted in January 2020 and was followed by Bone Canyon (January 2021),  Gated Prey (October 2021) and  Movieland  (June 2022), also set in Calabasas. In addition, the family of Kate O'Hare, the heroine of the five New York Times bestselling "Fox & O'Hare" that thrillers that Goldberg co-wrote with Janet Evanovich, lives in Calabasas.

The titular character of the TV show Ray Donovan lives in Calabasas with his wife and two children.

Notable people

 Charlie Adler, actor, director
 Shohreh Aghdashloo, actress, author
 Michael Ansara, actor
 Shiri Appleby, actor
 Adrienne Bailon, singer, actress, host
 Brandon Boyd, musician, singer
 Marcia Clark, prosecutor, author, television correspondent
 Jonathan Frakes, actor, director
 Lee Goldberg, author, screenwriter, publisher, producer
 D. L. Hughley, actor, commentator, radio host, author, comedian
 Kris Jenner, television personality
 Kylie Jenner, television personality
 Ken Jeong, actor and comedian
 Kim Kardashian, television personality
 Khloé Kardashian, television personality
 Keiran Lee, actor, director, producer
 Jake Paul, internet personality and actor
 Ed Shaughnessy, musician
 Daniel Steres, professional soccer player
 Joni Eareckson Tada, author
Jordyn Woods, model and entrepreneur

Sister cities 
  Anqing, Anhui,  China
  Mevaseret Zion, Jerusalem District,  Israel

See also

 Canoga Park, Los Angeles
 Flora of the Santa Monica Mountains
 History of the San Fernando Valley to 1915
 Los Angeles Pet Memorial Park
 Rancho El Escorpión
 West Hills, Los Angeles

References

External links

 
 Calabasas Chamber of Commerce

 
1991 establishments in California
Cities in Los Angeles County, California
Communities in the San Fernando Valley
Incorporated cities and towns in California
Populated places established in 1991
Populated places in the Santa Monica Mountains
San Fernando Valley
Simi Hills